The 1934 King's Birthday Honours in New Zealand, celebrating the official birthday of King George V, were appointments made by the King to various orders and honours to reward and highlight good works by New Zealanders. They were announced on 4 June 1934.

The recipients of honours are displayed here as they were styled before their new honour.

Knight Bachelor
 Robert Albert Anderson  – of Invercargill. For public services to shipping, education and banking.
 George Henry Wilson – of Auckland. For philanthropic services.

Order of Saint Michael and Saint George

Companion (CMG)
 James Christie  – parliamentary law draughtsman.
 George William Hutchison – mayor of Auckland.

Order of the British Empire

Commander (CBE)
Civil division
 Robert Percy Ward – lately under-secretary, Justice Department.

Companion of the Imperial Service Order (ISO)
 Ward George Wohlmann – Commissioner of Police.

References

Birthday Honours
1934 awards
1934 in New Zealand
New Zealand awards